Chandrakanta (1938- ) is a writer, born in Srinagar, India. She has written many novels and stories in the Hindi language including the epic Katha Satisar, which was awarded the Vyas Samman prize in 2005.

To date, her published short stories number about 200. She has also published seven novels as well as poetical works. Her writing concerns socio-political issues and women's concerns in general. The Indian State of Kashmir constitutes the backdrop of most of her writings, especially terrorism and the repercussions of it, notably the mass exodus of the majority community of "Kashmiri Pandits".

Her magnum opus is Katha Satisar [2001]. She has been the recipient of several awards, including the Subramanya Bharati award, awarded by the President of India for her literary work. Her works have also  been translated in many Indian languages, and into English. Her novel Ailan Gali Zinda Hai has been translated for the first time in English by Manisha Chaudhry, published by Zubaan Books (an imprint of 'Kaali for Women', Penguin India) as A Street in Srinagar, The translation was shortlisted for the 2012 DSC Prize for South Asian Literature. 

Her latest epic Hindi novel, Katha Satisar (published by Rajkamal publications), has been translated into English by Ranjana Kaul as The Saga of Satisar - published by Zubaan Books.It was Longlisted for the DSC award for South Asian literature in 2018. 

Chandrakanta lives in Gurgaon, India

Awards and honors

Jammu Kashmir Cultural Academy: Best Book Award
Arthantar (1982)
Ailan Galli Zinda Hai (1986)
O Son Kisri (1994)
Katha Satisar (2006)
Haryana Sahitya Academy:
Apne Apne Konark (1997)
Abbu Ne Kaha Tha (2006)
Hashiye Ki Ibarathen (2011)
Ministry of Human Resources & Development, Govt. of India:
Baki Sab Khairiyat Hai (1983)
Poshnool Ki Wapasi (1989)
Badalte Haalat Mein (2003 – 2004)
Hindi Academy, Delhi:
Katha Satisar (2002)
Vyas Samman, K. K. Birla foundation, Delhi:
Katha Satisar, Novel (2005)
Chandrawati Shukla Puraskar, Varanasi:
Katha Satisar, Novel (2006)
Kalpana Chawla Excellence Award for excellence in Hindi Literature (2005)
Richa Samman, Delhi for Hindi Literature (2006)
Wagmani Samman (2007)
Hindi Academy, Delhi Sahityakar Samman (2008)
Honored by First Lady of India (Mrs. Sharma) (1996)
Rashtriya Bhasha Gaurav Samman (2006)
Community Icon Award by All India Kashmiri Samaj (2006)
Sauhard Samman, Hindi Sansthan, Uttar Pradesh (2008)
Wagh Devi Puraskar, Kamla Goenka Foundation (2011)
Bal Mukund Puraskar, Haryana Sahitya Academy (2013)
Mahatma Gandhi Sahitya Saman, Lucknow (2014)
DSC Prize for South Asian Literature (2012), shortlist, A Street in Srinagar
Subramanyam Bharati Sahitya Samman, awarded by the President of India (2017)

Works
Novels and Story Collections

Salakhon Ke Peeche
Galat Logon Ke Beech
Poshnool Ki Vapasi
Ailan Gali Zinda Hai
Dahleez Per Niyay
Apne Apne Konark
 O Sonkisri
Suraj Ugne Tak
Kothe Par Kaga
Kali Baraf
Katha Nagar
Arthantar
 Katha Satisar
 Antim Sakshya
 Yahan Vitasta Behti Hai
 Baki Sab Khariyat Hai
Badalte Haalat Mein
 Abbu Ne Kaha Tha
Tanti Bai
Raat Mein Saagar
Alcatraz Dekha
 Anchalik Kahaniyan
 Prem Kahaniyan
 Charchit Kahaniyan
Yaadgaree Kahaniyan
Dus Pratinidhi Kahaniyan
Cheynit Kahaniyan
Chunihui Kahaniyan
Lokpriya Kahaniyan
Katha Samagr (4 volumes)

Poetry
 Yaheen Kahin Aas Paas

Memoirs
 Hashiye Kee Ibaratein
Mere Bhoj Patr
Prashno Ke Dayire mein (Interviews)

References

External links
 http://www.tribuneindia.com/2006/20060108/spectrum/book6.htm

Hindi-language writers
1938 births
Living people
Kashmiri people
People from Gurgaon
People from Srinagar